Kuningas is an Estonian and Finnish surname, meaning king in both Estonian and Finnish.

Geographical distribution
As of 2014, 60.7% of all known bearers of the surname Kuningas were residents of Estonia (frequency 1:2,714), 28.9% of Finland (1:23,693), 4.5% of the United States (1:10,034,758), 1.7% of Sweden (1:703,340) and 1.0% of Russia (1:18,036,396).

In Finland, the frequency of the surname was higher than national average (1:23,693) in the following regions:
 1. South Karelia (1:2,214)
 2. Kymenlaakso (1:8,138)
 3. North Karelia (1:14,334)
 4. Päijänne Tavastia (1:19,494)
 5. Uusimaa (1:21,055)

People
 Helle Kuningas (1949–2014), Estonian actress
 Merike Rõtova (born 1936), née Kuningas, Estonian chess player
 Mikko Kuningas (born 1997), Finnish professional footballer
 Tiit Kuningas (born 1949), Estonian sports journalist

References

Estonian-language surnames
Finnish-language surnames